Mantarō, Mantaro or Mantarou (written: 萬太郎 or 万太郎) is a masculine Japanese given name. Notable people with the name include:

 (1932–1987), Japanese linguist and sinologist
 (1889–1963), Japanese writer, playwright and poet

Fictional characters:
, protagonist of the manga series Kinnikuman Nisei

Japanese masculine given names